Youghal Greyhound Stadium is a greyhound racing track located south of Youghal, County Cork, Ireland. The stadium is ten minutes walk from the town centre.

History
On 30 July 1948 a greyhound called Hackles Spring won the first ever race at Youghal. The seaside track on the Upper Strand was run by the Youghal Racing Company before rásaíocht con éireann took over in 1972. 

The circuit is 464 yards in circumference and the track originally raced on Tuesday and Friday nights. Finbarr Coleman was racing manager for thirty years, from 1972 until 2002. Main events have included the Blackwater Cup, Paddy Stakes and Aherne Memorial Cup. 

Brian Collins and Pat Leahy both had short stints as Racing Manager until 2006 when Kathleen Lennon (daughter of the well-known breeder and trainer Denny) took over and became Ireland’s first female Racing Manager. Lennon left in 2012 to take over at Kilcohan Park.

John McGrath was appointed as the Racing and Commercial Manager from 2012.

In 2012 Greyhound Racing Ireland announced plans to spend over €100,000 to deliver improvements at the track. The improvements were completed in April 2014 and Tom Hayes, Minister of State at the Department of Agriculture, Food and the Marine opened the newly built facility. The refurbishment including a new judges box, and cost €134,000 in the end. Hayes complimented Bertie Lupton and the board of directors for their efforts at Youghal.

It was announced that Curraheen Park and Youghal Greyhound Stadium had helped raise more than €5m for charities, clubs and other good causes in 2015.

Operations
Racing takes place every Monday and Friday evening and the facilities include a fast food outlet, a bar, totalisator betting and inside and outside viewing areas. 

Race distances are 325, 525 and 550 yards  and the track has several feature events in the Irish racing calendar.

Track records
Current
  

Former

References

Greyhound racing venues in the Republic of Ireland
Youghal